The Sraffa–Hayek debate is debate between Piero Sraffa and Friedrich Hayek in 1930s. In 1931, Hayek critiqued John Maynard Keynes's Treatise on Money (1930) in his "Reflections on the pure theory of Mr. J. M. Keynes" and published his lectures at the LSE in book form as Prices and Production. Keynes replied to Hayek. After this, Keynes asked Sraffa to write a critical review of Prices and Production for the Economic Journal. Sraffa elaborated on the logical inconsistencies of Hayek's argument, especially concerning the effect of inflation-induced "forced savings" on the capital sector and about the definition of a "natural" interest rate in a growing economy. Hayek's response and Sraffa's rejoinder was published after this.

References 

Economic controversies